Taj Burrow (born 2 June 1978) is an Australian retired professional surfer. Taj retired from the WSL World Tour in June 2016 where he left a legacy of power and impressive surfing.

Early life
Burrow was born in Yallingup, Western Australia, Australia to American parents and began surfing at age 7.

Career
In 1998 he qualified for the ASP World Tour at the age of 18 years, becoming the youngest surfer to ever win a national title. Burrow had already earned a place on the world tour a year earlier, but he turned it down stating that, as a 17-year-old, he was "too young to do the tour full-on". After his first year on tour in 1998, Burrow claimed the ASP World Tour Rookie of the Year award after finishing 12th place in the rankings.

In 2007 Burrow won the Rip Curl Pro at Bells Beach, Victoria, Australia. He backed this up with a victory at the 2007 Billabong Pro in Jeffrey's Bay, South Africa, where he claimed the title over the then 8-time world champion, Kelly Slater. This win helped to secure his 2nd-place ranking on the ASP Men's Tour, his second runner-up season placing.

In 2009, Burrow defeated Slater in the final of the Billabong Pipeline Masters at the Banzai Pipeline. In the same year he finished fourth place on the World Tour.

Burrow won the 2013 Hurley Pro event in September 2013 for the first time, beating fellow Australian Julian Wilson.

Sponsors
As of September 2013, Burrow is sponsored by Globe, Billabong, Modom Surf, Von Zipper and Nanotune.

ASP Tour wins

Other projects
In 2003 Burrow released a book entitled Taj Burrow's Book of Hot Surfing, and has also produced a series of his own surf videos: Sabotaj (2000), Montaj (2002) and Taj Burrow's Fair Bits (2005).

In 2008–09 Globe released a shoe line named after Burrow.

Since 2005 Burrow has hosted the 'Taj Small Fries' junior surfing competition at Yallingup, Western Australia.

Personal life 
Burrow married Rebecca Jobson in November 2018. The couple had an intimate ceremony so Jobson's sick mother was able to attend. They had a second wedding in February 2019. The couple have two daughters.
Jobson was a contestant (and placed 6th) on cycle 4 of Australia's Next Top Model in 2008.

References

External links
 

1977 births
Living people
Australian people of American descent
Australian surfers
People from Busselton
World Surf League surfers